Audrey Deroin (born 6 September 1989 in Châtenay-Malabry) is a French handball player. She plays for the German club Thüringer HC and for the French national team.

She participated at the 2009 World Women's Handball Championship in China, winning a silver medal with the French team.  She repeated this feat two years later in Brazil.  She also played for France at the 2012 Summer Olympics.

References

External links 
 
 
 

1989 births
Living people
French female handball players
Olympic handball players of France
Handball players at the 2012 Summer Olympics
Sportspeople from Hauts-de-Seine
People from Châtenay-Malabry
Mediterranean Games medalists in handball
Mediterranean Games gold medalists for France
Competitors at the 2009 Mediterranean Games
21st-century French women